Felimare lalique is a species of sea slug or dorid nudibranch, a marine gastropod mollusc in the family Chromodorididae.

Description
The length of the shell attains 18 mm.

Distribution 
This species was described from a specimen measuring  collected at  depth at Sec Ferry, Guadeloupe, .

References

Chromodorididae
Gastropods described in 2013